Filemón Bartolomé Vela Jr. (born February 13, 1963) is an American lobbyist, lawyer and politician who served as the U.S. representative for  from 2013 until his resignation in 2022. He is a member of the Democratic Party. Vela was also vice chair of the Democratic National Committee, having been nominated by President Joe Biden. In March 2022, Vela resigned in the middle of his term to work at Akin Gump, the largest lobbying firm in the U.S.

Early life and education
Vela was born in Harlingen, Texas, and raised in nearby Brownsville. His father, Filemon Vela Sr., was a long-serving United States federal judge. The Reynaldo G. Garza–Filemon B. Vela United States Courthouse in Brownsville is named in Judge Vela's honor. His mother, Blanca Sanchez Vela, served as Brownsville's first female mayor from 1999 to 2003.

Filemon attended Saint Joseph Academy in Brownsville, and earned his Bachelor of Arts from Georgetown University in 1985. During his time at Georgetown, he served as an intern at the Federal Judicial Center, the research and education agency of the federal judicial system. He also served as an intern in Solomon P. Ortiz's office in Washington, D.C. Vela earned his Juris Doctor from the University of Texas at Austin School of Law in 1987.

Career 
In Edinburg School District v. Landmark, Vela represented Edinburg to fight for more funding. In Pharr-San Juan-Alamo Independent School District v. Landmark, he represented the district in fighting contractors accused of building a poorly constructed school facility.

U.S. House of Representatives

Elections

2012 

Vela ran in the newly created 34th congressional district as a Democrat. In the May 29 primary, he ranked first in an eight-candidate field with 40% of the vote. In the July 31 runoff, Vela defeated Denise Saenz Blanchard, 67% to 33%.

In the general election, Vela defeated Republican Jessica Bradshaw, 62% to 36%.

Tenure
In July 2013, Vela quit the Congressional Hispanic Caucus because of his opposition to the Hoeven-Corker Amendment that tied border security to a pathway to citizenship. He said "erecting more border fence drives a wedge between border communities which are culturally united".

On March 22, 2021, Vela announced that he would not seek reelection in the 2022 United States House of Representatives elections.

In August 2021, Vela joined a group of conservative Democrats, dubbed "The Unbreakable Nine", who threatened to derail the Biden administration's $3.5 trillion budget reconciliation package meant to tackle the nation's infrastructure.

On March 24, 2022, Vela confirmed that he would resign early from Congress to take a job at Akin Gump, a lobbying and law firm. His resignation officially went into effect before midnight on March 31.

Committee assignments
Committee on Agriculture
Subcommittee on General Farm Commodities and Risk Management
Subcommittee on Livestock, Rural Development, and Credit
Committee on Armed Services
Subcommittee on Seapower and Projection Forces
Subcommittee on Tactical Air and Land Forces.

Caucus memberships
 Congressional Hispanic Caucus
Congressional NextGen 9-1-1 Caucus
Veterinary Medicine Caucus
U.S.-Japan Caucus

Personal life
Vela's wife, Rose, was a Republican justice on Texas's 13th Court of Appeals from 2007 to 2012.

Vela is Roman Catholic.

See also
 List of Hispanic and Latino Americans in the United States Congress
 Final Report of the Task Force on Combating Terrorist and Foreign Fighter Travel

References

External links

|-

1963 births
21st-century American politicians
American lobbyists
American politicians of Mexican descent
Catholics from Texas
Catholic politicians from Texas
Democratic Party members of the United States House of Representatives from Texas
Georgetown University alumni
Hispanic and Latino American members of the United States Congress
Living people
Members of Congress who became lobbyists
People from Harlingen, Texas
Texas lawyers
University of Texas School of Law alumni